Bazin is a French surname of Germanic origin (from badhuo = battle). Notable people with the surname include:

 Anaïs Raucou (1797–1850), called Bazin, a French writer
André Bazin (1918–1958), French film critic and film theorist
Antoine Bazin (1799–1863), French sinologist
Charles-Louis Bazin (1802–1859), French painter, sculptor, engraver and lithographer
Claude Bazin de Bezons (1617–1684), French lawyer, politician, and second holder of l'Académie française, seat 1
 François Bazin (composer) (1816–1878), French opera composer
 François Bazin (sculptor) (1897–1956), French sculptor
François Xavier Bazin (1824–1865), French archetier and bow maker, patriarch of the Bazin family
Henri-Émile Bazin (1829–1917), French engineer
Hervé Bazin (1911–1996), French novelist
Janine Bazin (1923–2003), French film and television producer
Jean Bazin (1940–2019), Canadian lawyer and former senator
John Stephen Bazin (1796–1848), American bishop and longtime president of Spring Hill College
 Louis Bazin (1920–2011), French orientalist
Marc Bazin (1932–2010), Haitian Minister of Finance and Economy, World Bank official and Interim President of Haiti
Pierre-Antoine-Ernest Bazin (1807–1878), French physician and dermatologist, brother of Antoine Bazin
René Bazin (1853–1932), French novelist, great-uncle of Hervé Bazin
Thibault Bazin (born 1984), French politician

See also 

 Bazin Family, French bow makers

Surnames
French-language surnames
Surnames of French origin
Surnames of Haitian origin